The California Spangled is a breed of domestic cat that was bred to resemble spotted wild cats, like the ocelot and leopard. They were usually expensive, priced between US$800 and $2,500. The popularity of two other spotted cats breeds, the Ocicat and the Bengal, overshadowed their development.

Inspired by the poaching death of a leopard, the anthropologist Louis Leakey motivated Paul Arnold Casey, Jr. of California to breed a domestic cat resembling a small leopard in order to emphasize how important it was to preserve the leopard.

California Spangled cats are a crossbreed of many strains, including the Abyssinian, American Shorthair and British Shorthair. Despite their wild appearance, they are completely domestic.

History
Originally bred by Paul Arnold Casey, Jr., a Hollywood scriptwriter, playwright, and author, after his return from Tanzania while working with Louis Leakey in the 1970s. Casey's novel, "Open The Coffin" chronicles his journey in Africa and subsequent breeding that led to the California Spangle.

This animal was ideally bred to resemble a leopard, thus giving the impression of a "House-Leopard". One of many motivations for this breed was that people would not want to wear the same type of fur that resembled their pet.

The Spangle was introduced to the general public on the cover of the iconic Neiman Marcus Christmas catalog in 1986.

Appearance
This cat gives the initial impression of being a miniature leopard. It has a long, lean, somewhat muscular body and a low slung walk, along with spots. The most desired shape of spots on the cats is round, yet somewhat blockish. Triangular, oval, or square spots are acceptable also. The Spangle's coat may be any of the following colors: bronze, gold, blue, brown, charcoal, red, black, silver, or white. They have conspicuous cheekbones and light, large whisker pads. Spangles may look wild, but are purely domestic and adore playing and interacting with their people.

Personality
California Spangled Cats are said to be affectionate, social, curious, and extremely devoted to their owners. They are big on eye contact and being in on the action; they love to perch on places that are at shoulder or eye level so that they can see exactly what is going on. They are known for their well-honed intelligence, athletic abilities, high energy level, and accidental acrobatics. California Spangled Cats love to pounce and have very sharp hunting skills, they also enjoy games that involve a large participation part by their owner.

References

External links 

Breed originator Paul Casey's personal site  inactive link
petplace.netscape.com on California Spangled cats inactive link
California Spangled Cat Facts

Cat breeds
Cat breeds originating in the United States